Depression Cherry is the fifth studio album by the American dream pop duo Beach House. It was co-produced by the group and Chris Coady, and was released on August 28, 2015, by Sub Pop in the US, Bella Union in Europe, Mistletone Records in Australia, Hostess Entertainment in Japan and Arts & Crafts in Mexico. The album was recorded at Studio in the Country in Bogalusa, Louisiana, from November 2014 to January 2015. Reacting to their dissatisfaction with using live drums on tour to play songs from their previous album, Bloom (2012), for Depression Cherry, the band returned to simpler song arrangements, similar to those of its first two studio albums. "Sparks" was released as the lead single on July 1. The album received mostly positive reviews from critics. Less than two months after releasing Depression Cherry, Beach House followed it up with their sixth album, Thank Your Lucky Stars.

Background and recording
After Beach House completed touring for their previous record Bloom (2012), the group took a six-month break. Uncertain about their future, singer/keyboardist Victoria Legrand said, "I didn't feel creative at all... I just thought well, maybe I'll never have another musical idea." She added, "I just personally felt I needed a couple of months of just not doing anything, I didn't have thoughts." Legrand found herself frustrated and limited creatively by the presence of a live drum set on tour to play Blooms songs because of "the noise it creates and how much space it fills". Guitarist Alex Scally concurred, saying, "There was a transparent feeling, [the songs] didn't feel as nuanced."

Though some of Depression Cherrys musical ideas originated from 2012, Beach House wrote the majority of the record between autumn 2013 and 2014; "10:37" was one of the first songs to be written during this period. The album was recorded at Studio in the Country in Bogalusa, Louisiana over two months, from November 2014 to January 2015. It was co-produced by Chris Coady, who worked on the band's previous two records, Teen Dream (2010) and Bloom. Prior to joining the band in the studio, they sent him phone recordings of some of their in-progress songs. For the song "Days of Candy", they hired eight singers from Pearl River Community College to create a 24-part choir.  After completing that song and "Levitation", the band knew they had the album's closing and opening tracks, respectively, and considered the record completed. The album was mixed at Sunset Sound in Hollywood, California, except "Beyond Love", which was mixed at Sonic Ranch in Tornillo, Texas.

Promotion and release
On May 26, 2015, Beach House announced Depression Cherry along with tour dates supporting the album. According to the band, the album is a return to the simpler style of dream pop from their first two albums. In a press release on the Sub Pop website, the group said:

Vinyl and compact disc copies of the album feature a cover lined with red velvet. A limited edition "Loser Edition" of the album was released on clear vinyl record.

On July 1, 2015, Beach House released the album's lead single, "Sparks". On August 19, nine days before the release of Depression Cherry, NPR Music made a stream of the album available online.

Commercial performance 
Depression Cherry debuted at number eight on the Billboard 200, with 27,000 copies sold in its first week.

Reception

Depression Cherry received mostly positive reviews from contemporary music critics. At Metacritic, which assigns a weighted mean rating out of 100 to reviews from mainstream critics, the album received an average score of 76, based on 34 reviews, which indicates "generally favorable reviews".

Accolades

Track listing
All lyrics written by Victoria Legrand; all music composed and arranged by Beach House.

Personnel
Credits adapted from the liner notes of Depression Cherry.

Beach House
 Alex Scally
 Victoria Legrand

Additional musicians
 Graham Hill – live drums and percussion on all tracks except "Sparks" and "PPP"
 Chris Bear – live drums on "Sparks" and "PPP"
 Voice/choir majors at Pearl River Community College – vocal chorus on "Days of Candy"
Lane Stewart
Lydia Howard
Lindsey Strahan
Mallory Cumberland
Ethan Martin
Jacob Cochran
LaDona Tyson – organization
Archie Rawls – organization

Production
 Beach House – production, mixing
 Chris Coady – production, mixing on all tracks except "Beyond Love"
 David Tolomei – engineering
 Jay Wesley – assistant engineering
 Shane Wesley – "all around dude"
 Morgan Stratton – assistant engineering
 Manuel Calderon – mixing on "Beyond Love"
 Greg Calbi – mastering

Artwork
 Brian Roettinger – design
 Beach House – photography

Charts

Weekly charts

Year-end charts

References

2015 albums
Beach House albums
Sub Pop albums
Albums produced by Chris Coady
Albums recorded at Studio in the Country